Havashanq (also Romanized as Havāshānq; also known as Abashan and Āvāshānaq) is a village in Sanjabad-e Gharbi Rural District, in the Central District of Kowsar County, Ardabil Province, Iran. At the 2006 census, its population was 596, in 121 families.

References 

Tageo

Towns and villages in Kowsar County